Burmah was a passenger ship, which disappeared en route from England to New Zealand in 1859 or 1860.

Last voyage
Burmah was chartered by Willis, Gann & Co.  The ship left London for New Zealand on 30 August 1859. Regina passed icebergs the day after it passed Burmah. Burmah never arrived at New Zealand and was officially declared lost by Lloyds on 6 May 1860.

Burmah was carrying passengers and an assortment of breeding livestock.

The novelist Samuel Butler was booked to travel on Burmah to New Zealand, but he changed to a different ship, Roman Emperor, at the last moment, and therefore avoided the loss of Burmah.

References

Passenger ships of the United Kingdom
Missing ships
Maritime incidents in November 1859
1850s ships
Ships lost with all hands
Shipwrecks in the Southern Ocean